Catherine Amanda Fulop García (born March 11, 1965) is a Venezuelan actress, model, beauty pageant contestant, television presenter and radio host. She participated in the Miss Venezuela 1986, finishing as the fourth runner–up and in Miss Latin America, finishing as the third runner–up. Fulop has since launched a successful acting career throughout Latin America, most notably on television.

Biography 
Catherine Amanda Fulop García was born on March 11, 1965, in Caracas, Venezuela. She is the fifth daughter of a large family, of a Venezuelan mother and Hungarian father, who emigrated to Venezuela after World War II. She has six sisters and one brother.

Personal life 
Since 1990, she was married to actor Fernando Carrillo. The couple divorced in 1994 with Catherine Fulop accusing Carrillo of infidelity.

On April 3, 1998, she married the Argentine actor and businessman Osvaldo Sabatini, brother of the popular Argentine tennis player Gabriela Sabatini. On April 19, 1996, she gave birth to the couple's first child, a girl, whom they called Oriana Sabatini. On June 1, 1999, she gave birth to the couple's second child, a girl, whom they called Tiziana Beatriz Sabatini Fulop. Catherine Fulop and Osvaldo Sabatini briefly separated in 2001, but eventually reconciled. The family currently resides in Buenos Aires, Argentina.

Career

Modeling career 
In 1986, she participated in the Venezuelan beauty pageant Miss Venezuela 1986 representing the state of Vargas and she was chosen as a fourth finalist. In 1986, she participated in the Venezuelan beauty pageant Miss Latin America and she was chosen as the third finalist.

Television career 
Catherine Fulop began her career in television in the year 1987 in the television series Roberta where she makes a small participation. In 1987, she was the protagonist of the television series Mi amada Beatriz with Miguel Alcántara. In 1988, she was the protagonist of the television series La muchacha del Circo with Fernando Carrillo. In 1988, she was the protagonist of the television series Amor Marcado with Fernando Carrillo. From 1988 to 1989, she was the protagonist of the television series Abigail with Fernando Carrillo. From 1990 to 1991, she was the protagonist of the television series Pasionaria with Fernando Carrillo. From 1990 to 1991, she was the protagonist of the television series Mundo de fieras with Jean Carlo Simancas. From 1993 to 1994, she was the protagonist of the television series Déjate querer with Carlos Mata. In 1994, she makes a small participation in the television series ¡Grande, pa!. In 1994, she was the protagonist of the television series Cara bonita with Fernando Carrillo. From 2002 to 2003, she was part of the cast of the youth television series Rebelde Way starring Camila Bordonaba, Felipe Colombo, Luisana Lopilato and Benjamín Rojas. In 2004, she makes a small participation in the television series La niñera. In 2005, she makes a small participation in the television series ¿Quién es el Jefe?. In 2009, she makes a small participation in the television series Los exitosos Pells. In 2010, she makes a small participation in the television series La mujer perfecta. In 2011, she was the protagonist of the television series Porque te quiero así. In 2013, she makes a small participation in the television series Sos mi hombre. From 2013 to 2014, she was part of the cast of the television series Taxxi, amores cruzados. In 2015, she makes a small participation in the television series Viudas e hijos del Rock & Roll. From 2016 to 2017, she was part of the cast of the television series  Por amarte así.

Filmography

Television

Theater

Television Programs

Movies

Awards and nominations

References

External links 
 

1965 births
Living people
Actresses from Buenos Aires
Actresses from Caracas
Venezuelan emigrants to Argentina
Venezuelan film actresses
Venezuelan people of Hungarian descent
Venezuelan stage actresses
Venezuelan telenovela actresses
Venezuelan television actresses
Venezuelan television personalities
20th-century Venezuelan actresses
21st-century Venezuelan actresses
Naturalized citizens of Argentina
Bailando por un Sueño (Argentine TV series) participants